Maya Wertheimer (born 29 July 1990) is an Israeli actress, model and television presenter.

Biography
Wertheimer was born in Kfar Vradim. She is the daughter of billionaire Eitan Wertheimer (son of Israeli industrialist billionaire and former Knesset member Stef Wertheimer) and Ariela. She is the half-sister of Israeli singer Sivan Talmore.

She studied theater at Maagan Michael High School. As a young girl, she participated in Orna Porat's theater circle and did her military service in the IDF theater.

Wertheimer studied at the Nissan Nativ acting studio. She also holds a teaching certificate in yoga - a sport that helped her recover from a previous injury in a hit-and-run accident, after which she was in a wheelchair for several months and left behind physical injuries.

Career

Personal life
Wertheimer is married to Assaf Zamir, the current Israeli Consul General in New York, a former Knesset member on behalf of the Blue and White Party, a former Minister of Tourism and a deputy and acting mayor of Tel Aviv-Yafo. In January 2020, the couple welcomed their first daughter, Asia Miriam Zamir.

External links
  Maya Wertheimer on IMDb
Maya Wertheimer facebook page
Maya Wertheimer Instagram page

References

1990 births
Living people
Actresses from Tel Aviv
Israeli people of German-Jewish descent
20th-century Israeli Jews
21st-century Israeli Jews
Jewish Israeli actresses
Israeli film actresses
Israeli television actresses
Israeli stage actresses
Israeli female models
Israeli women television presenters
21st-century Israeli actresses